Amma (Translation: Mother) is a Hindi movie Directed by Sunil Batta and released in India in 2003.

Cast 
 Ayesha Jhulka
 Yashpal Sharma
 Sanjay Mishra 
 Surendra Pal
 Pratima Ghusia
 Shambhavi Agrawal

History
Amma was based on a real-life story and was chosen by the State Govt. of Uttar Pradesh (INDIA) to be awarded a subsidy of Rs.10 Lacs and exemption of entertainment tax for one year. The film was recalled in the National Film Festival 2003, out of a total of 132 films submitted. This film was the debut feature film of editor Amitabh Shukla.

References 
 https://web.archive.org/web/20140830103703/http://www.screenindia.com/old/20020927/fonsets.html
 https://web.archive.org/web/20110707151336/https://web.archive.org/web/20110707151336/https%3A//web.archive.org/web/20110707151336/https%3A//web.archive.org/web/20110707151336/http%3A//www.anytamil.com/php/moviemain.php?l=00005&t=0001&vs=a&s1=&g=&nst=&page=21&page=20

External links
 
 http://rohitsharmaonline.com/press2.htm

2000s Hindi-language films
2003 films